Undivided ATTN: is an American news program hosted by Hannah Stocking, Juanpa Zurita, Trae Crowder, and Lele Pons that premiered on July 18, 2018 on Facebook Watch. The show was broadcast on Wednesdays at 9 PM ET.

Format
Undivided ATTN: is described as an "explainer show that breaks down the biggest issue of the week. In 3-5 minute episodes hosted by a rotating cast of social influencers, Undivided ATTN: will provide context on the stories everybody’s talking about."

Production
On February 12, 2018, it was announced that Facebook was developing a news section within its streaming service Facebook Watch  to feature breaking news stories. The news section was set to be overseen by Facebook's head of news partnerships Campbell Brown.

On June 6, 2018, it was announced that Facebook's first slate of partners for their news section on Facebook Watch would include ATTN:. The news program the two companies developed was revealed to be titled Undivided ATTN:.

On June 15, 2018, it was announced that the show would premiere in July 2018 and be hosted by YouTube personality Hannah Stocking, vlogger Juanpa Zurita, comedian Trae Crowder, and internet personality Lele Pons.

References

External links

Facebook Watch original programming
2010s American television news shows
2018 American television series debuts